GIJ may refer to:
Generations In Jazz
 Gij, Iran
 G.I. Joe
 Gijima Group
 Ghana Institute of Journalism
 GNU Interpreter for Java